Vece Paes is a former Indian hockey midfielder, and representing the Indian team in the 1972 Munich Olympics, that won the bronze medal. He is the father of Indian tennis player Leander Paes. He is also a doctor in sports medicine.

He attended La Martiniere College in Lucknow. He is married to Jennifer Dutton, a great-granddaughter of Michael Madhusudan Dutt.

References

External links
 

Presidency University, Kolkata alumni
Olympic field hockey players of India
Field hockey players at the 1972 Summer Olympics
Indian male field hockey players
University of Calcutta alumni
La Martinière College, Lucknow alumni
Indian Roman Catholics
Field hockey players from Goa
Living people
Year of birth missing (living people)
Medalists at the 1972 Summer Olympics
Olympic bronze medalists for India